Pyrenopeziza is a genus of fungi in the family Dermateaceae. The genus contains 59 species.

Synonym: Excipula Fr., 1823.

Selected species
 Pyrenopeziza brassicae — cause of light leaf spot

See also
 List of Dermateaceae genera

References

External links
Pyrenopeziza at Index Fungorum

Dermateaceae genera
Taxa named by Karl Wilhelm Gottlieb Leopold Fuckel
Dermateaceae